Thomas Jefferson Henderson (November 29, 1824 – February 6, 1911) was a U.S. Representative from Illinois and a Union Army officer during the American Civil War.

Biography
Born in Brownsville, Tennessee, Henderson moved with his parents to Illinois at the age of eleven. He served as clerk of the Board of Commissioners of Stark County, Illinois from 1847 to 1849. and as clerk of the court of Stark County from 1849 to 1853. He studied law, was admitted to the bar in 1852 and commenced practice in Toulon, Illinois.

Henderson served as a member of the Illinois House of Representatives in 1855 and 1856 and then as a member of the Illinois Senate (1857–1860). He entered the Union Army in 1862 as colonel of the 112th Illinois Volunteer Infantry Regiment and fought in the siege of Knoxville and Atlanta Campaign being wounded at the Battle of Resaca. He commanded the 3rd Brigade, 3rd Division, XXIII Corps, from August 12, 1864. He was brevetted brigadier general in January 1865 and led his brigade at the Battle of Wilmington.

With the war's end, Henderson resumed the practice of law and moved to Princeton, Illinois, in 1867. He was appointed collector of internal revenue for the fifth district of Illinois in 1871.

Henderson was elected as a Republican to the Forty-fourth and to the nine succeeding Congresses (March 4, 1875 – March 3, 1895). He served as chairman of the Committee on Military Affairs (Forty-seventh Congress), and of the Committee on Rivers and Harbors (Fifty-first Congress). He also served as chairman of the Republican conference in the House. He was an unsuccessful candidate for renomination in 1894.

He was appointed to the board of managers for the National Home for Disabled Volunteer Soldiers in 1896. He was appointed civilian member on the Board of Ordnance and Fortifications in 1900 and served until his death in Washington, D.C. on February 6, 1911. He was interred in Oakland Cemetery in Princeton, Illinois.

References

1824 births
1911 deaths
Union Army colonels
Republican Party members of the United States House of Representatives from Illinois
19th-century American politicians
People from Brownsville, Tennessee